The Progressive People's Party was a political party in Namibia. It was formed on 30 November, 1986. This was after a split in the Rehoboth Baster Association.
Defunct political parties in Namibia